The Adamkiewicz reaction is part of a biochemical test used to detect the presence of the amino acid tryptophan in proteins. When concentrated sulfuric acid is combined with a solution of protein and glyoxylic acid, a red/purple colour is produced. It was named after its discoverer, Albert Wojciech Adamkiewicz. Pure sulphuric acid and a minimal amount of pure formaldehyde, along with an oxidizing agent introduced into the sulphuric acid, allow the reaction to proceed.

References 

Organic reactions
Biochemistry